Islampur, also called Salampur, is an administrative unit, known as Union council or Ward in Tehsil Babuzai, of Swat District in the Khyber Pakhtunkhwa province of Pakistan. Islampur is famous for its woolen products and shawls. It is adjacent to Saidu Sharif.

According to Khyber Pakhtunkhwa Local Government Act 2013. District Swat has 214 Wards, of which total amount of Village Councils is 170, and Neighborhoods is 44.

Islampur is a Territorial Ward, which is further divided in three Village Councils: Islampur (Village Council), Kokrai / Chitawar (Village Council), and  Marghuzar (Village Council)

See also 
 Babuzai
 Swat District

References

External links
Khyber-Pakhtunkhwa Government website section on Lower Dir
United Nations
Hajjinfo.org Uploads
 PBS paiman.jsi.com 

Swat District
Populated places in Swat District
Union councils of Khyber Pakhtunkhwa
Union Councils of Swat District